KSDN (930 AM) is a radio station licensed to serve Aberdeen, South Dakota.  The station is owned by Prairie Winds Broadcasting, Inc. It airs a News/Sports/Talk radio format.

930 KSDN carries syndicated The Dave Ramsey Show (radio program), Jim Bohannon Show, Michael Smerconish, Handel on the Law, At Home with Gary Sullivan, Gun Talk & Coast to Coast AM. Notable local programming consists of the KSDN Morning Report from 6-10am with Doc Sebastian & Ben Root.  Les Cummings handles the KSDN Midday (11a-1pm) and KSDN Evening (4-6pm) reports.

The station was assigned these call letters by the Federal Communications Commission.

History and ownership
KSDN's license was approved by the Federal Communications Commission June 29, 1948, after which the station began full operation. KSDN was owned by the Aberdeen News Company, publisher of the Aberdeen American-News. Studios were on Main Street in Aberdeen.

In 1997, Roberts Radio of Pleasantville, New York, acquired KSDN and KSDN-FM then, in a separate transaction, acquired KKAA, KKAA-FM, and KQAA-FM. KSDN-AM's studio were moved from the transmitter site on south highway 281 to the KKAA-AM transmitter site 2 miles south of Aberdeen, South Dakota. KSDN-AM's Full Service format was kept.

In June 2000, Clear Channel purchased Roberts Radio in a deal valued at a reported $65.9 million. Aberdeen radio stations KKAA (1560 AM), KQAA (94.9 FM), KSDN (930 AM), KSDN (94.1 FM) and KBFO (106.7 FM) were part of that deal.

In early October 2002, Clear Channel juggled the lineups of KKAA-AM and KSDN-AM. KKAA-AM shifted to a news/talk format and KSDN-AM shifted to a full-time sports talk station with a majority of its programing based out of KFAN-AM Minneapolis, MN "The Fan" .

Late 2004, Aberdeen Radio Ranch’s Rob & Todd Ingstad of Valley City, ND signed an agreement to acquire five Clear Channel-Aberdeen, SD stations: KKAA-AM, KSDN-AM/FM, KBFO-FM, KQAA-FM. In separate transactions, Aberdeen Radio Ranch agreed to convey the assets of three of its stations to other companies, leaving the Ingstads with six area stations KGIM-AM/FM, KBFO-FM, KSDN-AM/FM & KNBZ-FM. Sacramento-based Education Media Foundation picked up KQAA-FM. Oakland-based Family Stations acquired KKAA-AM and KQKD-AM. The studios were relocated from the KKAA-AM transmitter site to a newly remodeled south highway 281 building that houses the KSDN-AM/FM transmitters. Aberdeen Radio Ranch flipped the station's format from "The Fan" to its present News/Talk/Sports format as "Aberdeen's Information Station."

In May 2006, Armada Media Corporation reached an agreement to acquire KBFO, KGIM, KGIM-FM, KNBZ, KSDN, and KSDN-FM from Aberdeen Radio Ranch for a reported $9.25 million.

On November 1, 2013, Prairie Winds Broadcasting, Inc. reached an agreement to acquire KBFO, KGIM, KGIM-FM, KNBZ, KSDN, and KSDN-FM from Armada Media for $5.3 million.

References

External links
KSDN official website
Hub City Radio - Armada Media Corporation

FCC History Cards for KSDN

SDN
Sports radio stations in the United States
News and talk radio stations in the United States
1947 establishments in South Dakota
Radio stations established in 1947
Brown County, South Dakota